Arthur Hobgen (3 September 1849 – 26 March 1886) was an English cricketer.  Hobgen was a left-handed batsman who bowled right-arm roundarm slow.  He was born at Sidlesham, Sussex.

Hobgen made his first-class debut for Sussex against Gloucestershire in 1872.  He made two further first-class appearances for the county, against Gloucestershire and Yorkshire in 1873.  In his three first-class matches for Sussex, he scored a total of 31 runs at an average of 7.75, with a high score of 12.  With the ball, he took 2 wickets at a bowling average of 12.50, with best figures of 2/22.

Hobgen and his Sussex teammate James Lillywhite organised the English tour of Australia in 1876-77 that later came to be recognised as the first Test tour. Hobgen provided financial support, and Lillywhite captained the team.

Hobgen worked in Chichester as a farmer, auctioneer and surveyor, and was a junior partner in the family auctioneering firm. He married Fanny Neale in June 1878. He died at Apuldram, Sussex, on 26 March 1886, and Fanny died in December 1886.

References

External links
Arthur Hobgen at ESPNcricinfo
Arthur Hobgen at CricketArchive

1849 births
1886 deaths
People from Sidlesham
English cricketers
Sussex cricketers